Altıağac (also, Altiagach, Altyagach, Alty-Agatsch, Altiaghach, and Alyagach) is a village and municipality in the Khizi Rayon of Azerbaijan.  It has a population of 1,180.  The municipality consists of the villages of Altıağac, Qızılqazma, Çisti Klyuç, and Yarımca.

References 

Populated places in Khizi District